The 2011–12 UCI America Tour was the eighth season for the UCI America Tour. The season began on 2 October 2011 with the Tobago Cycling Classic and ended on 15 September 2012 with the Univest Grand Prix.

The points leader, based on the cumulative results of previous races, wears the UCI America Tour cycling jersey. Miguel Ubeto from Venezuela was the defending champion of the 2010–11 UCI America Tour. Rory Sutherland from Australia was crowned as the 2011–12 UCI America Tour champion.

Throughout the season, points are awarded to the top finishers of stages within stage races and the final general classification standings of each of the stages races and one-day events. The quality and complexity of a race also determines how many points are awarded to the top finishers, the higher the UCI rating of a race, the more points are awarded.

The UCI ratings from highest to lowest are as follows:
 Multi-day events: 2.HC, 2.1 and 2.2
 One-day events: 1.HC, 1.1 and 1.2

Events

2011

2012

Final standings

Individual classification

Team classification

Nation classification

Nation under-23 classification

External links

UCI America Tour
2012 in road cycling
2011 in road cycling
UCI
UCI
UCI
UCI